is Haruomi Hosono's fourth solo album and Yellow Magic Band (later on Yellow Magic Orchestra)'s first album. This album continues the tropical style of Hosono House, Tropical Dandy and Bon Voyage co., while being influenced by the music of Hawaii and Okinawa, incorporating electronic sounds that would be later developed on Hosono's and YMO's careers. YMO, The Yellow Magic Band at this point in time, was composed of Tin Pan Alley members and studio musicians, such as Hosono's former Happy End bandmate Shigeru Suzuki and future YMO members Ryuichi Sakamoto (who would later perform an altered version of "Asatoya Yunta" in his solo career) and Yukihiro Takahashi, as well as guitarist Hirofumi Tokutake (who would later perform in Technodon and Wild Sketch Show).

Track listing

Personnel 
Haruomi Hosono - Bass, Vocals, Steelpan, Marimba, Percussion, Synthesizer (Roland, Yamaha CP-30), Electric piano, Gong, Whistle, Electric guitar, Performer (Birds, Foot Steps), Production
Shigeru Suzuki & Hirofumi Tokutake - Electric Guitar (Suzuki on "Shimendōka" and "Asatoya Yunta"; Tokutake on "Femme Fatale")
Tatsuo Hayashi & Yukihiro Takahashi - Drums (Hayashi on "Tokio Rush", "Shimendōka", "Japanese Rhumba", "Asatoya Yunta", "Worry Beads" and "Paraiso"; Takahashi on "Femme Fatale")
Hiroshi Satō & Ryuichi Sakamoto - Synthesizer (Yamaha Polyphonic, Yamaha CS-80, ARP Odyssey, Rhodes Performer), Piano (both on "Tokio Rush" and "Paraiso"; Satō on "Shimendōka", "Japanese Rhumba", "Asatoya Yunta" and "Worry Beads"; Sakamoto on "Femme Fatale")
Motoya Hamaguchi & Nobu Saitō - Percussion (Hamaguchi on "Asatoya Yunta" and "Femme Fatale"; Saitō on "Tokio Rush", "Shimendōka", "Japanese Rhumba", "Worry Beads" and "Paraiso")
Masahiro Takekawa - Violin on "Worry Beads"
Teave Kamayatsu - Vocals on "Japanese Rhumba"
Taeko Ōnuki - Backing Vocals/Choir on "Tokio Rush" and "Worry Beads"
Tokyo Shyness Boys - Backing Vocals/Choir on "Tokio Rush" and "Japanese Rhumba"
Hiroshi Kamayatsu - Backing Vocals/Choir on "Japanese Rhumba"
Tomako Kawada - Backing Vocals/Choir on "Japanese Rhumba" and "Asatoya Yunta"

References

1978 albums
Haruomi Hosono albums
Yellow Magic Orchestra albums
Alfa Records albums